Pachperwa railway station is located in Pachperwa town of Balrampur district, Uttar Pradesh, India. It serves Pachperwa town. Its code is PPW. It has two platforms. Passenger, DEMU, and Express trains halt here.

Trains
There are many trains:

Gorakhpur−Badshahnagar Intercity Express
Gorakhpur–Sitapur Express (via Barhni)
55049/55050 Nakha Jungle–Daliganj Passenger
55031/55032 Nakaha Jungle–Lucknow Jn. Passenger 
75007/75008 Gorakhpur–Gonda DEMU (via Barhni)
75002/75005 Gorakhpur–Gonda DEMU (via Barhni)

References 

Lucknow NER railway division
Railway stations in Balrampur district